Jacob Matham (15 October 1571 – 20 January 1631), of Haarlem, was a famous engraver and pen-draftsman.

Biography

He was the stepson and pupil of painter and draftsman Hendrik Goltzius, and brother-in-law to engraver Simon van Poelenburgh, having married his sister, Marijtgen.  He made several engravings after the paintings of Peter Paul Rubens from 1611 to 1615, and also a series after the work of Pieter Aertsen.  In 1613, engraver Jan van de Velde was apprenticed to him.  He was the father of Jan, Theodor and Adriaen Matham, the latter of whom was a notable engraver in his own right.

References

External links

Vermeer and The Delft School, a full text exhibition catalog from The Metropolitan Museum of Art, which contains material on Jacob Matham

1571 births
1631 deaths
Dutch Golden Age printmakers
Artists from Haarlem
Renaissance engravers
Painters from Haarlem